Umm means mother in Arabic. It is a common Arabic feminine given name and generic prefix for Semitic place names. It may refer to:

Places

Bahrain
Ain Umm Sujoor, an archaeological site 
Umm an Nasan, an island
Umm as Sabaan, an islet

Egypt
Umm Kulthum Museum, in Old Cairo
Umm Naggat mine
Umm El Qa'ab, a necropolis 
Zawyet Umm El Rakham, an archaeological site

Iraq
Umm al Binni lake
Umm Qasr, a port city
Umm Qasr Port

Israel
Umm Batin, a village
Umm al-Fahm, a city
Shibli–Umm al-Ghanam, a town
Umm al-Hiran, a village
Umm al-Qutuf, a village

Jordan
Umm al Birak, a town
Jabal Umm Fruth Bridge
Jabal Umm ad Dami, a mountain
Mount Umm Daraj
Umm el-Jimal, a village
Umm al Kundum, a town
Umm Qais, a town
Umm al Qanafidh, a town
Umm Shujayrah al Gharbiyah, a town
Umm Zuwaytinah, a town

Kuwait
Umm al Maradim Island 
Umm an Namil Island, Kuwait Bay, Persian Gulf

Libya
Umm al Ahrar, an oasis
Qabr Umm al Hishah, an oasis
Umm al Rizam, a town

Palestine
Umm 'Ajra, a depopulated village
Tell Umm el-'Amr, a monastery
Khirbat Umm Burj, a village
Umm al-Faraj, a depopulated village
Umm Kalkha, a depopulated village
Umm al-Khair, Hebron, a village
Umm al-Kilab, a village
Umm Khalid, a depopulated village
Bayt Umm al-Mays, a depopulated village
Umm al-Nasr Mosque in Beit Hanoun, Gaza Strip
Umm ar-Rihan, a village
Khirbat Umm Sabuna, a depopulated village
Umm Salamuna, a village
Umm ash Shauf, a depopulated village
Umm al-Tut, a village
Umm az-Zinat, a depopulated village

Qatar
Umm Bab, a settlement 
Umm Birka, a settlement 
Umm al Ghaylam, a settlement 
Umm Ghuwailina, a settlement 
Umm al Hawa'ir, a settlement 
Umm al Kilab, a settlement 
Umm Lekhba, a settlement 
Umm Qarn, a settlement 
Umm al Qubur, an abandoned village 
Umm Salal, a municipality 
Umm Salal Mohammed, the seat of the municipality Umm Salal
Umm Salal Ali, a village 
Umm Tais National Park

Saudi Arabia
Umm Al-Hamam, a village 
Jabal Umm Hayfā', a mountain 
Jabal Umm al Ru'us, a town

Sudan
Umm Badr, a town
Umm Bel, a town 
Umm Dam, a town
Umm Ruwaba, a city
Umm Ruweim, an archaeological ruin site

Syria
Umm al-'Adam, a village
Umm al-Dawali, a village
Umm Elgar, a village
Umm Elkhalayel, a village
Umm Ghargan, a village
Maarat Umm Hawsh, a village
Umm Haratayn (disambiguation), multiple villages
Umm Jabab, a village
Umm Jalal, a village
Hawayiz Umm Jurn, a village
Umm al-Keif, a village
Umm el-Marra, an ancient city
Umm Mweilat Janubiyah, a village
Umm Nir, a village
Umm al-Qasab, a village
Umm al Quşayr (disambiguation), multiple village
Umm Rish, a village
Umm Sehrij, a village
Umm Tini, a village
Umm al-Tuyour, Hama Governorate, a village
Umm Waghfah, a village
Umm Walad, a town
Umm al-Zaytun, a village
Umm Zaytuna, a village

United Arab Emirates
Umm Hurair, a locality in Dubai
Umm Ramool, a locality in Dubai
Umm Suqeim, a locality in Dubai
Umm Al Sheif, a locality in Dubai
Umm al-Nar Culture, of 2600-2000 BC
Umm al-Quwain, one of the seven emirates

Yemen
`Arqub Umm Kubayr, a village
Bayt Umm Jalli, a village
Jawf Umm Maqbabah, a village
Qaryat Husayn Umm Muhammad, a village

Other uses
Umm (given name)
Umm Dreiga, an oasis town in Western Sahara

See also
UMM (disambiguation)
Umm al-Amad (disambiguation)
Umm al-Qura (disambiguation)